Iurceni is a commune in Nisporeni District, Moldova. It is composed of two villages, Iurceni and Mîrzoaia.

Gallery

References

Communes of Nisporeni District